Charles Francis Felix McGrath (born March 13, 1963) is an American retired World Cup alpine ski racer who competed in the Winter Olympics in 1988,
and three World Championships.

Career
McGrath raced for the United States Ski Team on the World Cup circuit from 1984 through 1990, and had one podium finish in slalom, runner-up to Alberto Tomba at Åre in 1988. He finished that season third in slalom and fifteenth overall.

As of 1987, he was the top U.S. ski racer, but was ranked 57th in the world. The Los Angeles Times wrote of his criticism for the lack of competency among the coaches, who were "putting exaggerated pressure on the racers." He felt that the coaches were not attuned to the steps required to develop relatively inexperienced skiers and were not cognizant of the personal training regimes of individual team members. At the World Championships in 1987, McGrath was tenth in the slalom.

McGrath was national champion five times. He became a ski instructor and coach at Waterville Valley in New Hampshire, and later for the ski team at the University of Vermont in Burlington. Ultimately, he became the head coach of the Norwegian women’s alpine team. He was named to Sports Illustrated's 50 Greatest Sports Figures from Vermont in 1999.

While a World Cup racer, McGrath made a commercial for Alka-Seltzer Plus, which was shown during the Super Bowl in January 1988.

World Cup results

Season standings

Points were only awarded for top fifteen finishes (see scoring system).

Race podiums

 1 podium – (1 SL), 5 top fives

World Championship results

Olympic results

Personal life
Born in Princeton, New Jersey, McGrath grew up in Norwich, Vermont, where his father Bob  (1935–2019) was a longtime art history professor at nearby Dartmouth College. McGrath married a Norwegian, Selma Lie, a cross-country ski racer for the University of Vermont; their son Atle Lie McGrath (b.2000) is a World Cup alpine racer for the Norwegian ski team.

Video
YouTube – Alka-Seltzer Plus commercial (1987)

References

External links

Felix McGrath World Cup standings at the International Ski Federation

 sports-reference.com

1963 births
Living people
American male alpine skiers
Olympic alpine skiers of the United States
Alpine skiers at the 1988 Winter Olympics
People from Princeton, New Jersey
Sportspeople from Vermont